Masrur Mashkhurovich Kiyomidinov (born 21 January 2002) is a Tajikistani footballer who plays for Naftan Novopolotsk.

International career
Kiyomidinov has been called up to Belarus national under-17 team in 2017 for a number of friendly matches and to Russia national under-17 team training camp in 2018, but has not made official match debut for either team.

References

External links

2002 births
Living people
Tajikistani footballers
Belarusian footballers
Association football midfielders
FC Dinamo Minsk players
FC Vitebsk players
FC Naftan Novopolotsk players